Susan Lynn Gordon (July 27, 1949 – December 11, 2011) was an American child actress who appeared in films and numerous episodes of television programs such as The Twilight Zone, My Three Sons, and The Donna Reed Show.

Life and career 

Gordon was born in Saint Paul, Minnesota, the daughter of film director Bert I. Gordon and his wife Flora (Lang) Gordon. She began her career, at age eight, as a last-minute substitute for another young actress in 1958's Attack of the Puppet People, directed by her father, who subsequently directed her in three additional films — The Boy and the Pirates, Tormented (both 1960) and 1966's Picture Mommy Dead, her final film. In 1959, she acted and sang in the semi-biographical film, The Five Pennies, playing the daughter of musician, composer and bandleader Red Nichols, portrayed by Danny Kaye.

On television, Gordon appeared in The Twilight Zone episode "The Fugitive", as Jenny, a child with a leg brace who befriends an alien. Other series included Gunsmoke (1961 Episode “Little Girl” – S6E28), Alfred Hitchcock Presents, My Three Sons, The Danny Thomas Show, Route 66, Ben Casey, 77 Sunset Strip  and The Donna Reed Show. On November 27, 1959, Gordon appeared in the live NBC Television broadcast of Miracle on 34th Street.

Coming out of a decade-long retirement, Ms. Gordon appeared Off-Broadway in 2002 in A Magic Place in a New Time. Previous to that, she was an understudy for the long-running hit Nunsense.

Death 
She was a resident of the New Jersey township of Teaneck, a suburb of New York City, where she had settled after returning to her Jewish roots and marrying Avi Aviner, who had been a leader of the Jewish community in Tokyo. She died on December 11, 2011, of thyroid cancer, aged 62. She was buried in Kedumim, an Israeli settlement. She was survived by her husband, six children, and five grandchildren, as well as her parents and two sisters, Carol and Patricia.

References

External links 

1949 births
2011 deaths
American child actresses
American film actresses
American television actresses
Deaths from cancer in New Jersey
Deaths from thyroid cancer
Jewish American actresses
Actresses from Saint Paul, Minnesota
People from Teaneck, New Jersey
21st-century American Jews
21st-century American women